Eupithecia villica is a moth in the family Geometridae. It is found in south-western China (Tibet, Yunnan).

The forewings are pale yellowish buff and the hindwings are white.

References

External links

Moths described in 2006
Endemic fauna of China
Moths of Asia
villica